The List of shipwrecks in 1771 includes some ships sunk, wrecked or otherwise lost during 1771.

January

5 January

12 January

18 January

19 January

26 January

27 January

28 January

29 January

31 January

Unknown date

February

18 February

21 February

24 February

Unknown date

March

5 March

6 March

14 March

21 March

27 March

Unknown date

April

15 April

25 April

28 April

Unknown date

May

15 May

17 May

25 May

29 May

Unknown date

June

6 June

9 June

17 June

21 June

Unknown date

July

1 July

2 July

11 July

31 July

Unknown date

August

21 August

24 August

25 August

26 August

Unknown date

September

15 September

24 September

Unknown date

October

7 October

8 October

9 October

12 October

13 October

14 October

15 October

22 October

24 October

26 October

28 October

Unknown date

November

5 November

10 November

14 November

16 November

17 November

23 November

30 November

Unknown date

December

8 December

9 December

10 December

20 December

24 December

29 December

Unknown date

Unknown date

References

1771